Avarua (meaning "Two Harbours" in Cook Islands Māori) is a town and district in the north of the island of Rarotonga, and is the national capital of the Cook Islands.

The town is served by Rarotonga International Airport (IATA Airport Code: RAR) and Avatiu Harbour.

The population of Avarua District is 4,906 (census of 2016).

Sub-districts

The district of Avarua is subdivided into 19 tapere (traditional sub-districts) out of 54 for Rarotonga, grouped into 6 Census Districts, listed from west to east. Census figures are not available on the tapere level, but only for the so-called Census Districts, also listed from west to east:

 Nikao-Panama (1,373 inhabitants), covering the taperes of:
 Pokoinu,
 Nikao (seat of Cook Islands parliament), and
 Puapuautu;
 Avatiu-Ruatonga (951 inhabitants), covering the taperes of:
 Areanu,
 Kaikaveka,
 Atupa,
 Avatiu (commercial port), and
 Ruatonga;
 Tutakimoa-Teotue (314 inhabitants), covering the tapere of:
 Tutakimoa;
 Takuvaine-Parekura (786 inhabitants), covering the taperes of:
 Tauae 
 Takuvaine (downtown Avarua, seat of Cook Islands government, with Avarua fishing harbour)
 Tupapa-Maraerenga (531 inhabitants), covering the taperes of:
 Ngatipa, and
 Vaikai;
 Pue-Matavera (1,490 inhabitants), covering the taperes of:
 Tapae-I-Uta,
 Tapae
 Pue,
 Punamaia,
 Kiikii, and
 Tupapa.

Climate
Avarua has a tropical rainforest climate (Af) according to the Köppen climate classification with high temperatures and rainfall throughout the year. Although there are no true wet or dry seasons, there is a noticeably wetter stretch from December to April.

References

External links

Photo of Government Radio Station Rarotonga c1950

 
Capitals in Oceania
Districts of the Cook Islands
Populated places in the Cook Islands
Rarotonga